In Vietnamese, the term bánh ( or , Chữ Nôm: 餅) translates loosely as "cake" or "bread", but refers to a wide variety of prepared foods that can easily be eaten by hands or chopsticks. With the addition of qualifying adjectives, bánh refers to a wide variety of sweet or savory, distinct cakes, buns, pastries, sandwiches, and other food items, which may be cooked by steaming, baking, frying, deep-frying, or boiling. Foods made from wheat flour or rice flour are generally called bánh, but the term may also refer to certain varieties of noodle and fish cake dishes, such as bánh canh and bánh hỏi.

Each variety of bánh is designated by a descriptive word or phrase that follows the word bánh, such as bánh bò or bánh chuối. Bánh that are wrapped in leaves before steaming are called bánh lá.

In Vietnamese, the term  is not limited to Vietnamese cuisine: it applies equally to items as varied as fortune cookies, pudding, caramel custard, sacramental bread, Hamburger, etc.

In some cases, the word can also refer to inedibles that have a cake-like shape, such as wheels, bath soaps, and compressed tobacco wheels.

Varieties
There is a nearly endless variety of named dishes with the prefix bánh. What follows is a list of the most typical traditional varieties of bánh.

Noodles

Bánh canh – tapioca noodles which are cut from a large sheet.
Bánh hỏi – extremely thin noodles that are woven into intricate bundles and often topped with chopped scallions and a complementary meat dish
Bánh phở – The steamed flat and thin cake made from rice flour and water before being cut into strips. The strips are not only called Bánh phở but also "con phở" or "cọng phở," and are noodles  used in phở. The width of the strips is usually around 1 cm or less.

Dumplings

 Bánh bá trạng or bánh ú – the Vietnamese term for zongzi
Bánh bao – ball-shaped bun filled with pork and/or other ingredients
Bánh bột lọc – tapioca cake packed with shrimp
 Bánh bột lọc trần – dumplings with wrappers made of tapioca starch; similar to Chaozhou fun guo
 Bánh bột lọc lá – tiny rice flour dumplings stuffed with shrimp and ground pork and wrapped in a banana leaf; from Hue
 Bánh cam – deep-fried glutinous rice sesame balls filled with sweetened mung bean paste; from southern Vietnam
 Bánh ít – small stuffed glutinous rice flour balls
 Bánh ít trần – "naked" small stuffed glutinous rice flour balls
 Bánh khúc – glutinous rice ball
 Bánh nậm – flat rice flour dumpling from Hue stuffed with minced pork and wood ear mushroom, and seasoned with black pepper and spices; wrapped in a banana leaf
Bánh phu thê – (
 Bánh Bò Mã Lai - Hong Kong Style Malaysian Steamed Sponge Cake 
Bánh Bò Nướng - Vietnamese Baked Honey Comb Cake
Bánh Bò Nướng Chay - a vegetarian version of bánh bò nướng 
 Bánh cáy, rectangular-shaped sweet dessert made by roasting and grinding glutinous rice and other ingredients
 Bánh da lợn – colored steamed layer cake made from tapioca starch, rice flour, coconut milk and/or water, sugar, and other ingredients
 Bánh đúc – rice cake or corn cake eaten as a dessert or savory meal
 Bánh chuối – banana cake
 Bánh gối – a type of bread originating from Chinese fried dumpling
 Bánh khảo – a sweet cake made from glutinous rice flour and sugar
 Bánh khảo sữa – a sweet cake made from glutinous rice flour, sugar, and milk powder
 Bánh khoai mì – sweet cassava cake
 Bánh khoai môn – taro cake
 Bánh tiêu – hollow donuts
 Bánh trung thu – mooncake

Dishes for special occasions

 Bánh chưng – square-shaped steamed glutinous rice dumpling wrapped in a dong leaf (lá dong)
 Bánh tét – log-shaped cylindrical glutinous rice cake, wrapped in a banana leaf and filled with a meat or vegetarian filling
 Bánh trôi photo – served together with bánh chay
 Bánh tổ – a round, golden/taupe colored, sticky cake served for new years. It's made of glutinous rice flour, sugar, water, and soybean oil. Like the Chinese new year cake, nian gao, the bánh tổ is cut into thin slices then dipped in egg and fried before serving. This is an uncommon pastry and it is said the shape represents a wheel. It is sometimes decorated with white sesame seeds and red food coloring. (cf. kue keranjang in Indonesia)

Others
 Bánh bông lan, called bánh gatô in northern Vietnam – sponge cake
Bánh Bông Lan Bơ - Fruit/Butter Cake
 Bánh Bông Lan Cuốn - Swiss Roll
 Bánh Bông Lan Phú Sĩ - Mountain Fuji Cake
 Bánh Bông Lan Rễ Tre - Honeycomb Sponge Cake
 Bánh chay – served together with bánh trôi
 Bánh cốm – green rice cake made using cốm with mung bean filling
 Bánh cuốn
 Bánh cáy
 
 Bánh đa (Northern) or Bánh tráng nướng (Southern)- rice cracker
 Bánh đậu xanh – sweet mung bean paste
 Bánh dừa
 Bánh gai – made from the leaves of the "gai" tree (Boehmeria nivea) dried, boiled, ground into small pieces, then mixed with glutinous rice, wrapped in banana leaf. The filling is made from a mixture of coconut, mung bean, peanuts, winter melon, sesame, and lotus seeds.
 Bánh giầy, also written as bánh dầy – white, flat, round glutinous rice cake with tough, chewy texture filled with mung bean or served with Vietnamese sausage (Giò lụa)
 Bánh giò – pyramid shaped rice dough dumplings filled with pork, shallot, and wood ear mushroom wrapped in banana leaf
 Bánh hoa hồngphoto – rice cake that is shaped like a flower and made with mung bean paste
 Bánh kẹp – Vietnamese waffle cookies made from rice flour, like a Pizzelle
 Bánh kẹp lá dứa – pandan waffle
 Bánh mật – Molasses-sweetened glutinous rice cake - filled with green bean paste or groundnut
 Bánh lá dừa – Cake wrapped in coconut leaf
 Bánh phồng tôm – prawn crackers
 Bánh phục linh – cookies made from tapioca flour, coconut milk, and sugar
 Chè lam Phủ Quảng
 Bánh quế
 Bánh tráng mè
 Bánh bà lai hoa hồng
 Bánh xếp bột gạo
 Bánh xếp bột gạo
 Bánh bèo ngọt
 Bánh bèo nhân tôm thịt
 Bánh bèo xiêm
 Bánh tầm bì
 Bánh bao ca dé - Coconut Custard Bao
 Bánh pía - a Teochew Pastry
 Bánh Chuối Hấp - Steamed Banana Cake 
 Bánh Chuối Nướng - Baked Banana Bread Pudding 
 Bánh Cốm - Rice Flake Cakes
 Bánh Đập - Rice crackers stuck together
 Bánh Dẻo - Vietnamese Ping Pei Mooncakes 
 Bánh Dẻo Cuộn - Ping Pei Rolls
 Bánh Flan - crème caramel
 Bánh Gan - "Liver" Cake
 Bánh Hạnh Nhân - Vietnamese Almond/Peanut Cookies
 Bánh Hoa Mai/Hoa Đào - Cherry/Plum Blossom Cookies
 Bánh Hoa Sen - Lotus Pastries 
 Bánh in - Print Cakes
 Bánh Men - Yeast Cookies
 Bánh Quai Vạc - Coconut/Mung Bean Puffs 
 Bánh Quế/Bánh Kẹp - Vietnamese Love Letters
 Bánh Sát Phu - Husband Killers
 Bánh Thuẫn Hấp - Steamed Cup Cakes
 Bánh Ú Nước Tro - Lye Water Dumplings 
 Bánh Bao Nương Nhân Xá Xíu - baked char siu bao
 Bào Ngư Xào Nấm Đông Cô - Braised Shitake Mushrooms with Abalone 
 Bánh Hoa Hồng - Rose Dumplings 
 Bánh Khoai Môn Tàn Ong - Dim sum Taro Puffs
 Bánh Mì Chiên - Fried Baguettes 
 Bánh Mì Hấp - Steamed Baguettes 
 Bánh patê sô – A French-inspired meat-filled pastry. Characterized by flaky crust and either pork or chicken as the filling.
 Bánh Phồng Tôm - Shrimp Crackers/Chips 
 Bánh trôi nước

See also

 Bánh at Vietnamese Wikipedia
 Bing (Chinese flatbread)
 Mochi
 List of steamed foods
 Vietnamese cuisine

References

External links

Alice's Guide to Vietnamese Banh
che bot loc

Vietnamese words and phrases
Deep fried foods
Steamed foods
Bánh